Marius Christensen (20 November 1889 – 31 October 1964) was a Danish modern pentathlete. He competed at the 1920 and 1924 Summer Olympics.

References

External links
 

1889 births
1964 deaths
Danish male modern pentathletes
Olympic modern pentathletes of Denmark
Modern pentathletes at the 1920 Summer Olympics
Modern pentathletes at the 1924 Summer Olympics
People from Vejle Municipality
Sportspeople from the Region of Southern Denmark